The South Indian International Movie Awards for Best Director' is an annual award for best director awarded in four categories for Tamil cinema, Telugu cinema, Kannada cinema, and Malayalam cinema films.

History 
The award started in June 2012 by Vishnu Vardhan Induri and Brenda Prasad Adusimilli. The tenth edition of the award show will be held in Bangalore on 10 and 11 September 2022.

Winners

References

SIIMA
South Indian International Movie Awards